Julie Smith (born 3 October 1973) is a Scottish former footballer who played as a defender. She spent her entire club career at Kilmarnock, and was capped 75 times by the Scottish national team between 1998 and 2006.

Career 
Smith joined Stewarton Thistle Ladies at the age of nine, and spent her entire playing career at the club (later renamed FC Kilmarnock Ladies in 1999). She was a member of the Kilmarnock team that won the Scottish Women's Football League title in 2001/02, as well as the inaugural Scottish Women's Premier League title in 2002/03. Smith was also part of the Kilmarnock team that won the Scottish Women's Cup consecutively in 2001 and 2002, before finishing runners-up to Hibernian in 2003. She retired at the end of the 2008/09 season at the age of 35, after Kilmarnock narrowly avoided relegation from the Premier League.

Smith won her first of 75 international caps against Spain in September 1998, and remained a regular in the Scottish national side until her retirement from international football in October 2006. She won her 50th cap in Scotland's 5-1 victory over Ukraine in a Euro 2005 qualifying match at Almondvale Stadium, Livingston. In April 2005, Smith scored a decisive own goal against England at Prenton Park, in a 2-1 defeat for Scotland.

Personal life 
During her playing career, Smith worked as a development scientist in Edinburgh.

Honours

Club

Kilmarnock 

 Scottish Women's Football League
 Winners: 2001/02
 Scottish Women's Premier League
 Winners: 2002/03
 Scottish Women's Cup
 Winners: 2000/01, 2001/02
 Runners-up: 2002/03

References 

1973 births
Scottish women's footballers
Scottish sportswomen
F.C. Kilmarnock Ladies players
Scotland women's international footballers
Women's association football defenders
Living people